Minority of One is an album by the band Dag Nasty, released in 2002. It was recorded at Inner Ear studios in January 2002. The band had broken up in 1988 but reunited to record Minority of One.

Track listing
  "Ghosts" - 2:49
  "Minority of One" - 2:18
  "Bottle This" - 3:52
  "Broken Days" - 3:54
  "Your Words" - 2:02
  "Incinerate" - 1:57
  "Throwing Darts" - 2:01
  "White Flag" - 3:29
  "Twisted Again" - 2:41
  "Average Man" - 3:22
  "Wasting Away" - 3:26
  "100 Punks" [Hidden Track] - 3:21

Personnel
Dag Nasty
Dave Smalley - Vocals
Brian Baker - Guitars
Roger Marbury - Bass
Colin Sears - Drums
Steve Hansgen - Producer
Don Zientara- Producer

References

Dag Nasty albums
2002 albums